Dario Mijatović (born 13 August 1984) is a Croatian retired football player.

Career
He played abroad for Vejle Boldklub in the Danish Superliga. On 16 January 2006 he signed a -year contract with the Danish club. He scored 5 goals in 54 matches for the club, who released him in July 2008.

He joined Croatia Sesvete in September 2008.

References

External links
 Vejle Boldklub profile

1984 births
Living people
Association football defenders
Croatian footballers
Croatia youth international footballers
NK Istra 1961 players
Vejle Boldklub players
NK Croatia Sesvete players
Borussia Neunkirchen players
Danish Superliga players
Danish 1st Division players
Croatian Football League players
Oberliga (football) players
Croatian expatriate footballers
Expatriate men's footballers in Denmark
Croatian expatriate sportspeople in Denmark
Expatriate footballers in Germany
Croatian expatriate sportspeople in Germany